Belford v. Scribner, 144 U.S. 488 (1892), was a United States Supreme Court case in which the Court held 1) A copyright is held by default with the person whose name it was taken out in, regardless of potential conflicts with state law. 2) If a work contains a mixture of original and copyright infringing material, but it is so intermingled as to be inseparable, then the copyright holder may take all profits from the work.

The work in question was Common Sense in the Household by Marion Harland. Her husband claimed that the copyright and profits derived therefrom belonged to him because the common law of New Jersey asserted that a wife held no share in property gained during a marriage.

References

External links
 

1892 in United States case law
Marriage law in the United States
United States copyright case law
United States Supreme Court cases
United States Supreme Court cases of the Fuller Court